Unai Expósito Medina (born 23 January 1980) is a Spanish former footballer who played as a right back.

He appeared in Segunda División 149 games during six seasons (five goals), representing in the competition Numancia
(two spells), Hércules and Cartagena. In La Liga, he played for Athletic Bilbao and Osasuna.

Club career
Born in Barakaldo, Biscay, Expósito graduated from Lezama, Athletic Bilbao's renowned youth academy, and made his debut for the first team during the 1999–2000 campaign while also appearing for the reserve side. From 2003 to 2005, after a season-long loan with CD Numancia in the second division, he represented neighbours CA Osasuna also in La Liga.

In 2005, Expósito returned to Athletic as a full member of the main squad but, after making just three appearances in 2007–08, he signed for Hércules CF in the second level. After one sole season he joined another club in that tier, recently promoted FC Cartagena.

Personal life
Expósito is the nephew of Iosu Expósito, ex-guitarist and singer of Spanish punk rock band Eskorbuto.

References

External links

1980 births
Living people
Spanish footballers
Footballers from Barakaldo
Association football defenders
La Liga players
Segunda División players
Segunda División B players
Tercera División players
Danok Bat CF players
CD Basconia footballers
Bilbao Athletic footballers
Athletic Bilbao footballers
CD Numancia players
CA Osasuna players
Hércules CF players
FC Cartagena footballers
Barakaldo CF footballers
CD Santurtzi players
Basque Country international footballers